Łopuchówko  is a village in the administrative district of Gmina Murowana Goślina, within Poznań County, Greater Poland Voivodeship, in west-central Poland.

Łopuchówko is situated within the Puszcza Zielonka forest and landscape park. It is approximately 3 km south of the larger village of Łopuchowo (the name Łopuchówko is a diminutive of Łopuchowo). Łopuchówko houses the headquarters of the district forestry board (Nadleśnictwo Łopuchówko) which is responsible for administration of the surrounding forest areas.

References

Villages in Poznań County